Prithu Gupta is an Indian chess grandmaster from Gurgaon. He reached this milestone in July 2019, at the age of 15 years and 4 months, 31 years after Viswanathan Anand became India's first GM. He began playing chess when he was nine years old, which is relatively late compared to most other grandmasters.

Career 
Beginning with an Elo rating of 1,187 in October 2013, Prithu went past 2,500 in less than six years of competition despite playing in a lesser number of tournaments, focusing instead on the top-ranking events, which featured the best players.  
 
Prithu achieved his maiden International Master (IM) norm at the Silver Lake Open in Silver Lake, Veliko Gradište, Serbia, in July 2017, and his second IM norm came a month later at the Golden Prague Chess Festival in the Czech Republic, where he won seven out of his nine matches in the round-robin event, finishing top and crossing 2,300 Elo rating points in the process. 

In January 2018 at the Tradewise Gibraltar Masters, Prithu won the title of International Master and achieved his first Grandmaster (GM) norm. Then, following a tied-4th finish at the 7th Llucmajor Open in Palma da Mallorca, Prithu obtained his second GM norm at the Biel International Chess Festival in Switzerland, in July 2018. 

Also in July 2018, Prithu earned top honours in the team event of the Portuguese League in Porto, and in October of the same year, he was judged the second-best youngster in the under-18 category at the Isle of Man Masters in the UK. 

In July 2019, at age 15, and three months after finishing runner-up amongst juniors at the Reykjavik Open (under-18 category), Prithu secured his third GM norm with a round to spare at the Porticcio Open in Corsica, where he finished ninth. A week later during the Portuguese League (first division), he became India’s 64th Grandmaster – after his win in the fifth round against German IM Lev Yankelevich, Prithu’s Elo rating crossed 2,500. 

For his achievements, and for reaching that all-important third GM norm and moving past 2,500 Elo points to confirm his Grandmaster status, Prithu was honoured with the state award for outstanding sportspersons by the government of Haryana, his home state, in August 2019, and was a recipient of the Pradhan Mantri Rashtriya Bal Puraskar award in January 2020. The Rashtriya Bal Puraskar is given to Indians under the age of 18 for exceptional efforts in different fields, including sport.

Achievements 
 2017: 1st IM norm, Silver Lake Open, Serbia
 2017: 1st position, Golden Prague Chess Festival
 2017: 2nd IM norm, Golden Prague Chess Festival
 2018: Secured third IM norm and won title of International Master, Tradewise Gibraltar Masters, Gibraltar
 2018: 1st GM norm, Tradewise Gibraltar Masters, Gibraltar
 2018: 2nd GM norm, Biel International Chess Festival, Biel, Switzerland
 2018: 1st position, team event, Portuguese Team Championship
 2019: Achieved third and final GM norm, Porticcio Open, Corsica
 2019: Became India’s 64th Grandmaster, Portuguese League, Evora, Portugal
 2020: Pradhan Mantri Rashtriya Bal Puraskar

References

External links 
 "Prithu Gupta: International title in kitty, Gurugram teen eyes Grand Master tag | Gurgaon News - Times of India"
 "Praise for Prithu Gupta but teen has his feet on the ground | Gurgaon News - Times of India"
 "Prithu Gupta: Prithu Gupta makes it 2 GM norms in 3 chess tournaments | Gurgaon News - Times of India"
 "Prithu Gupta becomes the 64th GM of Indian chess at the age of 15 years, 4 months and 10 days - ChessBase India"
 "Prithu Gupta: Late to the board, now among the best - Sportstar"
 "Prithu Gupta – a chess talent with a mind of a monk - Sportstar"
 "India's 64th GM Prithu Gupta visits India's 1st GM Vishy Anand's home in Chennai - ChessBase India"

2004 births
Living people
Indian chess players
Chess grandmasters